The Silverton Tramway W class was a class of 4-8-2 steam locomotives operated by the Silverton Tramway Company.

History
In January 1949, the Silverton Tramway Company ordered two 4-8-2 locomotives from Beyer, Peacock & Co, Manchester, to the same design as the Western Australian Government Railways W class. A further two were ordered in November 1950.

All four arrived at Port Pirie in October 1951 and, after final assembly, moved to Broken Hill in a convoy, with two in steam. Until 1953, all were hired to the South Australian Railways on a rotating basis, operating services out of Peterborough, until the South Australian Railways 400 class locomotives were delivered.

The Silverton W class differed from the WAGR examples in having a skyline cowling running the length of the boiler and smokebox, Westinghouse air brakes, and an additional blow-down valve in the middle of the bottom of the boiler barrel.

When the 48s class diesels arrived in 1961, the W class locomotives were retired, after only 10 years in service. They remained in store until disposed of in 1970, with three now preserved. The Pichi Richi Railway has a locomotive operating as W22, although it is actually W916 masquerading as W22, including some parts from the latter.

Class list

References

Beyer, Peacock locomotives
Railway locomotives introduced in 1951
Silverton Tramway
Steam locomotives of New South Wales
3 ft 6 in gauge locomotives of Australia
4-8-2 locomotives
Passenger locomotives